The 1991 European Water Polo Champions' Cup was the 28th edition of the premier competition for European men's water polo teams. Defending champion Mladost Zagreb defeated Canottieri Napoli in the final to win its sixth title, tying with as the competition's most successful team.

Quarterfinals

Semifinals

Final

References

1991 in water polo
LEN Champions League seasons